Calathus tombesii is a species of ground beetle from the Platyninae subfamily that is endemic to Italy.

References

tombesii
Beetles described in 1976
Endemic fauna of Italy
Beetles of Europe